Fredrik Per Oscar Sjöström (born May 6, 1983) is a Swedish former professional ice hockey winger, currently the general manager of Frölunda HC of the Swedish Hockey League (SHL). Drafted by the National Hockey League (NHL)'s Phoenix Coyotes in the 2001 NHL Entry Draft, Sjöström played over 500 regular season NHL and Stanley Cup playoff games with the Coyotes, New York Rangers, Calgary Flames and Toronto Maple Leafs.

Playing career

Sjöström began his career playing for Frölunda HC in the top-level Elitserien and after being drafted by the Phoenix Coyotes in the 2001 NHL Entry Draft with the team's first pick, 11th overall. He later moved to North America to play major junior hockey for the Calgary Hitmen in the Western Hockey League (WHL). Sjöström made his NHL debut in the 2003–04 season, scoring 13 points in 57 games for Phoenix.

On July 13, 2006, Sjöström signed a one-way, two-year contract extension worth $1.5 million with the Coyotes. On February 26, 2008, he was traded to the New York Rangers (along with David LeNeveu and Josh Gratton) in exchange for Marcel Hossa and Al Montoya. Sjöström played on the Rangers' fourth line, used as a checking line. On March 2, he then scored his first goal as a Ranger after beating Antero Niittymäki of the Philadelphia Flyers with assists from Blair Betts and Marek Malík.

On July 1, 2009, Sjöström signed a two-year, $1.5 million contract with the Calgary Flames, but was later traded (alongside Dion Phaneuf and prospect Keith Aulie) to the Toronto Maple Leafs in exchange for Matt Stajan, Niklas Hagman, Jamal Mayers and Ian White that same season on January 31, 2010. Upon expiry of his contract with Toronto in 2011, Sjöström returned to Sweden, signing a one-year contract with Färjestad BK of the Elitserien.

Sjöström officially announced his retirement from professional hockey on August 29, 2013. He moved directly into a scouting position with Frölunda for the 2013–14 season. He later began his managerial career first as an assistant before taking over the general manager role with Frölunda midway through the 2015–16 season.

International play
Sjöström played for Sweden in three world junior ice hockey championship. He made his debut for Sweden's men's team during the Euro Hockey Tour final against Finland, and was selected to play at the 2004 Men's World Ice Hockey Championships, where Tre Kronor won a silver medal.

Career statistics

Regular season and playoffs

International

References

External links
 

1983 births
Arizona Coyotes draft picks
Calgary Flames players
Calgary Hitmen players
Färjestad BK players
Frölunda HC players
Living people
National Hockey League first-round draft picks
New York Rangers players
People from Färgelanda Municipality
Phoenix Coyotes players
Springfield Falcons players
Swedish expatriate ice hockey players in Canada
Swedish expatriate ice hockey players in the United States
Swedish ice hockey right wingers
Toronto Maple Leafs players
Utah Grizzlies (AHL) players
Sportspeople from Västra Götaland County